Dynamin-1-like protein is a GTPase that regulates mitochondrial fission. In humans, dynamin-1-like protein, which is typically referred to as dynamin-related protein 1 (Drp1), is encoded by the DNM1L gene and is part of the dynamin superfamily (DSP) family of proteins.

Structure 

Drp1, which is a member of the dynamin superfamily of proteins, consists of a GTPase and GTPase effector domain that are separated from each other by a helical segment of amino acids. There are 3 mouse and 6 human isoforms of Drp1, including a brain-specific variant. Drp1 exists as homooligomers and its function relies on its oligomerization ability.

Function 

Mitochondria routinely undergo fission and fusion events that maintain a dynamic reticular network. Drp1 is a fundamental component of mitochondrial fission.  Indeed, Drp1 deficient neurons have large, strongly interconnected mitochondria due to dysfunctional fission machinery. Fission helps facilitate mitophagy, which is the breakdown and recycling of damaged mitochondria. Dysfunction in the DRP activity may result in mutated DNA or malfunctioning proteins diffusing throughout the mitochondrial system. In addition, fission results in fragmented mitochondria more capable of producing of reactive oxygen species, which can disrupt normal biochemical processes inside of cells. ROS can be formed from incomplete transfer of electrons through the electron transport chain. Furthermore, fission influences calcium flux within the cell, linking Drp1 to apoptosis and cancer.

Several studies have indicated that Drp1 is essential for proper embryonic development. Drp1 knockout mice exhibit abnormal brain development and die around embryonic day 12. In neural specific Drp1 knockout mice, brain size is reduced and apoptosis is increased. Synapse formation and neurite growth are also impaired. A second group of researchers generated another neural specific knockout mouse line. They found that knocking out Drp1 resulted in the appearance of large mitochondria in Purkinje cells and prevented neural tube formation.

In humans, loss of Drp1 function affects brain development and is also associated with early mortality.

Interactions 

The majority of knowledge about mitochondrial fission comes from studies with yeast. The yeast homolog of Drp1 is dynamin-1 (Dnm1), which interacts with Fis1 through Mdv1. This interaction causes Dnm1 to oligomerize and form rings around dividing mitochondria at the so-called "constriction point". Drp1 has also been shown to interact with GSK3B.  In mammals, Drp1 receptors include Mff, Mid49 and Mid51

Post-translational modifications to Drp1 (e.g. phosphorylation) can alter its activity and affect the rate of fission.

Drp1 has two major phosphorylation sites.  The CDK phosphorylation site is S579, and the PKA site is S600 in Drp1 isoform 3.  Phosphorylation by CDK is thought to be activating, whereas PKA phosphorylation is thought to be inhibitory. Recently, CaMKII was shown to phosphorylate Drp1 at S616.  This was shown to occur in response to chronic Beta-adrenergic stimulation and to promote mPTP opening.  Other post-translational modifications include S-nitrosylation, sumoylation, and ubiquitination. Higher S- nitrosylation modifications of Drp1, which enhances Drp1 activity, have been observed in Alzheimer’s Disease. Furthermore, Drp1 has been shown to interact with Aβ monomers, thought to play an important role in Alzheimer’s Disease, exacerbating the disease and its symptoms. Drp1 has been linked to a number of pathways and processes including cell division, apoptosis, and necrosis. Drp1 has been shown to stabilize p53 during oxidative stress, promoting its translocation to the mitochondria and encouraging mitochondrial- related necrosis. In addition, cyclin B1- CDK activates Drp1, causing fragmentation and ensuring mitochondria are distributed to each daughter cell after mitosis.  Likewise, different transcriptional controllers are able to alter Drp1 activity through gene expression and regulation. For example, PPARGC1A  and [HIF1A]  regulated Drp1 activity through gene expression.

Therapy 

Inhibition of Drp1 has been considered for possible therapeutics for a variety of diseases. The most studied inhibitor is a small molecule named mitochondrial division inhibitor 1 (mdivi-1) which may have off-target effects such as inhibition of complex 1 of the mitochondrial respiratory chain. The inhibitors putative function is preventing the GTPase activity of Drp1 thus preventing the activation and localization to the mitochondria.  Midiv-1 has been demonstrated to attenuate the effects of ischemia reperfusion injury after cardiac arrest. The treatment prevented both mitochondria fragmentation and increased cell viability. Similarly, midiv-1 has demonstrated neuroprotective effects by greatly reducing neuron death due to seizure. Furthermore, the study showed midiv-1 was capable to preventing the activation of caspase 3 by reversing the release of cytochrome c in intrinsic apoptosis. Whether mdivi-1 inhibits Drp1 or not, its therapeutic potential is certainly evident. Other than directly inhibiting Drp1, certain inhibitors of proteins involved in the posttranslational modifications of Drp1 have been studied. FK506 is a calcineurin inhibitor, which functions to dephosphorylate the serine 637 position of Drp1, encouraging translocation to the mitochondria and fragmentation. FK506 was shown to also preserve mitochondrial morphology after reperfusion injury.

References

Further reading

External links